Agios Stefanos ( meaning Saint Stephen) is a village and a community in the municipality West Achaea, Greece. It is located on both sides of the river Tytheus, 17 km southwest of Patras. As of 2011, Agios Stefanos had a population of 124 for the village and 901 for the community, which includes the villages Palaia Peristera and Fylakes. Agios Stefanos is part of the municipal unit of Olenia.

Population

See also
List of settlements in Achaea

References

External links
 Agios Stefanos at the GTP Travel Pages

Olenia
Populated places in Achaea